Hand in Hand: Center for Jewish-Arab Education in Israel is a network of integrated, bilingual schools for Jewish and Arab children in Israel. Hand in Hand was co-founded by Israeli Arab educator Amin Khalaf and Israeli American educator Lee Gordon in 1997 with 50 students at two campuses.

Hand in Hand's mission is to create a strong and inclusive shared society in Israel through a network of integrated, bilingual schools and active communities. The organization's philosophy is that the actual living experience of its students, teachers, parents and others who participate in its schools and communities can inspire broad support for social inclusion and civic equality in Israel.

Hand in Hand now operates seven schools with more than 2,100 Jewish and Arab students. More than 3,000 parents and other adults, Jews and Arabs alike, currently participate in integrated community activities organized by Hand in Hand. Over the next 10 years, Hand in Hand aims to create a network of 10 to 15 integrated bilingual schools, supported and enhanced by active communities, altogether involving more than 20,000 Israeli citizens. .

History

Hand in Hand was founded in 1997 by two Israeli educators, one Arab and one Jewish. They started the first two schools in 1998, one in the Galilee region near the Misgav Regional Council and one in Jerusalem. These first two schools grew, and in the summer of 2003, a group of interested parents from the Wadi Ara region in the Arab Triangle met to express interest in establishing a third Hand in Hand School in their region.

After delays, which included difficulty winning recognition from the Israeli Ministry of Education, the "Bridge over the Wadi" (Gesher al haWadi,) school opened on September 1, 2004, with 106 students. The teachers come from Jewish and Arab towns in the area.

Hand in Hand's fourth school opened in September 2007 in the city of Beer Sheva. This school is now fully independent of Hand in Hand.

On October 21, 2007, Hand in Hand's Max Rayne school opened in Jerusalem's Pat neighborhood near the Arab village of Beit Safafa. The new campus was built with $11 million from donors including the Jerusalem Foundation, the Rayne Foundation, and other European donors.

In 2012, a preschool was opened in the urban area of Haifa, by Dr. Merav Ben-Nun, with a kindergarten in 2013. In 2016 an elementary school was opened In Carmelia. THe school moved to another neighborhood in Haifa in 2019.

Hand in Hand has also partnered with Project Harmony Israel  since 2010 to provide an English immersion summer camp for Hand in Hand students as well as students from around Jerusalem.

Conflict

2014 arson attack in Jerusalem
In November 2014 the Hand in Hand Max Rayne School was subjected to an arson, suspected of being a hate crime that was racially motivated. The school was also defaced with anti-Arab slogans such as "Death to Arabs" and "Kahane was right!" Shortly thereafter, the "Tag Meir" coexistence organization held a support rally to counter those who threaten Arab-Jewish cooperation and promoting racism in Israel. Mohamad Marzouk, head of communications for the Hand in Hand school in Kfar Qara, noted that the attack brought out a show of community support for the school. In the minds of many people the arson, he said, "crossed a red line." The Israeli police arrested a number of suspects in connection with this arson attack.

Following the arrest, the mother of one of the arsonists said she would have burned the school as well, if it were not illegal to do so, and she expressed disgust and revulsion that Jews and Arabs studied together at the school. In 2018, one of the arsonists, Yitzhak Gabai, was invited to a Channel 14 talk show for a friendly conversation. The left-wing and right-wing commentators smiled and laughed as Gabai recounted the terrorist attack. The show engendered a social media backlash, and Channel 14 apologized.

Aftermath of attack
Israeli President Reuven Rivlin, along with his wife Nechama, invited the Hand in Hand first graders to his official residence along with their teachers. He told them: "I am excited to welcome you to the President’s Residence. You are proof that we can live side by side in peace, and we must not let difficult experiences - such as the one you have been through - harm our belief in our ability to coexist."

International recognition
In December 2014 the White House commissioned a menorah made by students at the Max Rayne schools and invited two of its students to join U.S. President Barack Obama and First Lady Michelle Obama as they welcomed over 500 guests to the White House Hanukkah celebration. Each of the branches on the multi-colored wooden menorah represents one of the schools' values: Community, Education, Freedom, Human Dignity, Peace, Equality, Solidarity, and Friendship. President Obama said these "students teach us an important lesson for this time in our history. The light of hope must outlast the fires of hate. That’s what the Hanukkah story teaches us. It’s what our young people can teach us— that one act of faith can make a miracle, that love is stronger than hate, that peace can triumph over conflict.”

Educational philosophy

The Hand in Hand philosophy stems from the observation that Jewish and Arab citizens of Israel live separately from one another in virtually all aspects of daily life.  This separation is particularly obvious in the K-12 public education system, which is based on separate schools for Jews and Arabs. Although children may legally attend either type of school, the fact is that only a few Arab children attend Jewish schools (where the primary language of instruction is Hebrew), and essentially no Jewish children attend Arab schools (where the primary language of instruction is Arabic). The separation of the communities, and the barriers to communication carry through to other aspects of adult life.

In 1998, Hand in Hand began establishing a network of schools with integrated student populations, integrated teaching and supervisory staffs, and a bilingual educational curriculum and methodology. From the beginning, Hand in Hand has been committed to maintaining its schools as part of the Israeli public education system: operating under the supervision of the Ministry of Education, using a core curriculum based on Ministry of Education-approved content, and receiving substantial core funding from the Ministry of Education budget.

To this Ministry of Education core, Hand in Hand has added special elements to implement the bilingual education and social values that are its reason for being:

Both Hebrew and Arabic are primary languages of instruction (often with dual teachers in a single classroom);
The curriculum includes extra content to acknowledge and respect the traditions, history, values, holidays, and culture of all students (Jewish, Christian and Muslim); and
Specialized guidance and mentoring help students, teachers, and parents express empathy and mutual respect in the most difficult of circumstances.

Starting with two kindergarten classes and about 50 children in 1998, Hand in Hand had grown by 2011 to three schools with more than 900 children, covering grades levels K-12. Over the years, these three schools have demonstrated some truly outstanding academic achievements, and they will enroll over 1100 students in the fall of 2013. Also this fall, two new kindergartens (Haifa and Tel Aviv/Jaffa) will open; each one has pre-registration of many more students (both Jews and Arabs) than can be accepted in the space available.

Shared Communities
During 2012, Hand in Hand established active integrated communities of adults to support and amplify the impact of its schools. With core funding from the U.S. Agency for International Development (USAID), Hand in Hand launched communities in all five locations where it will have schools this fall. These communities are engaged in a wide variety of activities: from competing in adult sports leagues (where they may have the only integrated team); to participating in adult education programs focused on learning each other’s language, culture and traditions; to engaging in activities that might be directly tied to a school (such as establishing a vegetable garden tended by parents and children). These activities may not seem very important in themselves, but the fact that they are undertaken in the context of a structured, continuing, and integrated community makes them very special in Israel. Hand in Hand believes that these visibly integrated shared communities will not only help its schools succeed, but will also show the broader public that social inclusion does not end with graduation from high school.

The Future

In the coming years, Hand in Hand plans to expand its two-pronged approach to building support for social inclusion and civic equality in Israeli society:

 The five current schools (including the new preschools in Haifa & Tel Aviv/Jaffa) will grow year-by-year, both in grade level and number of students. And new integrated bilingual schools will be established in appropriate locations. Eventually, 10 to 15 Hand in Hand schools will form a strong network of integrated bilingual schools across Israel; and hopefully that network will include schools established by other NGOs and perhaps directly by governmental authorities.
The Jerusalem school is currently in the process of building a large addition which, when completed, will serve the new high school. 
 Active shared communities will be initiated and sustained in every location where there is a school. In 10 years, these communities, plus the students, parents and teachers directly involved in the schools, should include some 20,000+ individuals who have visibly chosen to live important parts of their daily lives through institutions that embody the values of a shared, inclusive and equal society – values that were the foundation of the State of Israel.

See also
Givat Haviva - a left-wing, shared society oriented educational institute in Israel
HaKfar HaYarok - a youth village in Israel, with a number of progressive educational institutions
Neve Shalom - a cooperative village jointly founded by Israeli Jews and Palestinian-Israeli Arabs

References

External links
Hand in Hand's English website

Schools in Israel
Peace organizations based in Israel
Israel educational programs
Non-governmental organizations involved in the Israeli–Palestinian peace process
1997 establishments in Israel